Charles J. Tarver is an American football wide receiver who is currently a free agent. He played college football at Hudson Valley Community College

Early life
Tarver attended Bishop Maginn High School in Albany, New York where he was a member of both the basketball and football teams.

College career
Tarver attended Hudson Valley Community College after high school, where he continued his football career. After just one semester at Hudson Valley, Tarver transferred to Schenectady County Community College, he played basketball.

Professional career

Saginaw Sting
Tarver joined the Saginaw Sting of the Continental Indoor Football League (CIFL) in 2012. Playing as a wide receiver, Tarver was named the CIFL's Special Teams Player of the Year in 2012. Tarver also helped the Sting win the 2012 CIFL Championship Game over the Dayton Silverbacks. Tarver returned to the Sting in 2013, where he was named the CIFL's MVP as well as Special Teams Player of the Year, but the Sting fell in the Championship Game to the Erie Explosion.

Winnipeg Blue Bombers
In April 2014, Tarver signed with the Winnipeg Blue Bombers of the Canadian Football League (CFL).

Erie Explosion
On May 12, 2015, Tarver signed with the Erie Explosion of the Professional Indoor Football League (PIFL).

Abilene Warriors
Tarver signed with the Abilene Warriors of American Indoor Football in 2016.

Boston Blaze
Tarver signed with the Boston Blaze of the Can-Am Indoor Football League in 2017.

References

External links
Winnipeg Blue Bombers bio

1984 births
Living people
American football running backs
American football wide receivers
American men's basketball players
American players of Canadian football
Basketball players from New York (state)
Canadian football wide receivers
Erie Explosion players
Hudson Valley Vikings football players
Junior college men's basketball players in the United States
Players of American football from New York (state)
Saginaw Sting players
Sportspeople from Albany, New York
Trenton Freedom players
Winnipeg Blue Bombers players
Winston Wildcats players